Sheikh Hamad bin Khalifa bin Ahmed al-Thani is a Qatar football administrator, coach, member in the Fifa council and AFC Professional Football. He is elected president of the Arabian Gulf Football Association, and president of the Qatar Football Association since 2015, prior to being president he was the vice president of the Qatar Football Association.

Education 
He earned his BA from the Qatar University in Physical Education.

He had served as the Chairman of the Local Organizing Committee of the AFC Asian Cup and also member of the Supreme Committee for Delivery & Legacy, Qatar.

Notes 

Qatari sports executives and administrators
People from Doha
Year of birth missing (living people)
Living people
Qatar University alumni
Football people in Qatar